Niv Zrihan (born May 24, 1994) is an Israeli footballer who plays for Hapoel Tel Aviv.

References

1994 births
Israeli Jews
Living people
Footballers from Ashdod
Israeli footballers
F.C. Ashdod players
Hapoel Be'er Sheva F.C. players
Bnei Yehuda Tel Aviv F.C. players
Beitar Jerusalem F.C. players
Hapoel Tel Aviv F.C. players
Israeli Premier League players
Israeli people of Moroccan-Jewish descent
Israel under-21 international footballers
Association football forwards